Anil Wadha; born 26 May 1957 is an Indian civil servant who belongs to the Indian Foreign Service cadre. He has served as the Indian Ambassador to Italy, Poland, Oman and Thailand. He is currently a Senior Fellow & Cluster Leader at the Vivekananda International Foundation in New Delhi.

Personal life
Wadhwa holds a Master of Arts with a specialisation in Chinese History as well as Medieval Indian history and Architecture from the University of Delhi. He is married to Deepa Gopalan Wadhwa, who also belongs to the Indian Foreign Service. They have two sons.

Career
Anil Wadhwa was a member of the Indian Foreign Service from 1 July 1979 to 31 May 2017. He has served at the Indian missions in Hong Kong, Beijing, Geneva, Warsaw, Muscat, Bangkok and Rome.

He has served as the Director/Joint Secretary at the Technical Secretariat of the Organisation for the Prohibition of Chemical Weapons, The Hague from July 1993 to July 2000.

He was also a United Nations Disarmament Fellow at Geneva from July to November 1989. During Wadhwa's tenure as the Indian Ambassador to Italy and San Marino, he served as the Indian Permanent representative to three Rome-based agencies of the United Nations: Food and Agriculture Organization, International Fund for Agricultural Development and World Food Programme.

Wadhwa has coordinated the evacuation of Indian nationals from Iraq, Yemen and Libya while serving as the Secretary (East) in the Ministry of External Affairs, India. He was also associated with the Operation Raahat.

See also
A. Gitesh Sarma
Harsh V Shringla
Vijay Gokhale

References

Ambassadors of India to Italy
Ambassadors of India to Oman
Living people
1957 births
Ambassadors of India to Poland
Ambassadors of India to Thailand